Project Neptune, also known as Enterprise Neptune, is a long-term project of the National Trust to acquire or put under covenant a substantial part of the Welsh, English and Northern Irish coastline.  In 1999 it was relaunched as the Neptune Coastline Campaign. It is named for the Roman god of the sea.

The Project began in May 1965 with the acquisition of Whiteford Burrows in the Gower Peninsula. The aim was to protect the coastline from being developed or industrialised.

By 1973 the project had reached its original £2 million fundraising target and looked after  of coastline. By 1986 the National Trust had raised £8.75 million through Project Neptune. The Project looked after  of British coastline by 2009.

The Project owns some of the UK's most iconic coast including land near the Giant's Causeway in Northern Ireland,  of the White Cliffs of Dover and The Needles.  The project includes four World Heritage Sites and nine lighthouses.  The Project has not been completely successful in achieving its ambitions, having had its £1 million bid for Land's End turned down in 1981.

The Project is currently focussed on the maintenance of the coastline that it already owns, particularly with regard to coastal management.

References

.
Coasts of the United Kingdom
Conservation in England
Conservation in Wales
Environmental organizations established in 1965
1965 establishments in the United Kingdom